StyleRocks is an online Australian company that offers custom-made jewellery.

History 
StyleRocks was founded by Pascale Helyar-Moray with the intend of offering affordable customizable jewelry. Helyar-Moray was inspired by the model of mass customisation as used by various fashion companies. After the birth of her twins, Pascale Helyar-Moray relocated from London to Australia and officially started StyleRocks.

Products 
StyleRocks allows its customers to fashion their own bespoke items, including necklaces, rings, cufflinks, earrings and bracelets. StyleRocks also features the ability to print one's desired ring design in 3D prior to purchase.

Reception and market 
Jeweller Magazine reported that StyleRocks "was proving popular with the bridal market" Recently, In Startup Daily, Mat Beeche observed that StyleRocks had "a buyer return and purchase rate of 17%".

Cate Blanchett has been seen wearing StyleRocks jewellery.

References

External links 
StyleRocks Official Website

Companies based in Sydney
Jewellery companies of Australia